Plehn is a surname. Notable people with the surname include:

 Carl C. Plehn (1867–1945), American economist
 Elsbeth Plehn (1922–2001), German operatic contralto and voice teacher
 Marianne Plehn (1863–1946), German zoologist
 Michael T. Plehn (born 1965), lieutenant general in the United States Air Force

German-language surnames